Efrén Navarro (born May 14, 1986) is a Mexican-American professional baseball first baseman and left fielder for the Toros de Tijuana of the  Mexican Baseball League, and Tomateros de Culiacán of the Mexican Pacific League. He previously played in MLB for the Los Angeles Angels of Anaheim, Detroit Tigers and Chicago Cubs, and in Nippon Professional Baseball (NPB) for the Hanshin Tigers. He also plays on the Mexico national baseball team.

Early life
Navarro was born in Lynwood, California. He graduated from Lynwood High School in Lynwood, California. His family is from San Lorenzo Michoacán México. He played college baseball at University of Nevada, Las Vegas.

Professional career

Los Angeles Angels of Anaheim
Navarro was drafted by the Los Angeles Angels of Anaheim in the 50th round of the 2007 Major League Baseball draft.

He was a 2011 recipient of the Rawlings Gold Glove Award with the Salt Lake Bees.
Navarro joined the Angels during September call-ups on September 1, 2011. Navarro spent the whole 2012 season in the minors, batting .294/.336/.403 for Salt Lake. Navarro played in 64 games for the Angels in 2013, hitting .245/.302/.340 in 159 at bats.

Against the Seattle Mariners on July 18, 2014, Navarro came in to pinch-hit for John McDonald in the bottom of the 16th inning. He ripped the first pitch through to centerfield, driving in the winning run represented by Mike Trout who was on second base after hitting his 100th career double. It was Navarro's first career walk-off RBI and the first pinch-hit walk-off by an Angel since September 7, 2012. It was just the second pinch-hit walk-off in the 16th inning or later in Angels franchise history.
Efren hit his first career home run off Justin Verlander on July 26.

Navarro was designated for assignment by the Angels on January 19, 2016.

Baltimore Orioles
On January 26, 2016, Navarro was traded to the Baltimore Orioles for cash considerations. He was designated for assignment on February 25, 2016, and elected free agency rather than accept a minor league assignment.

Seattle Mariners
On March 2, 2016, Navarro signed a minor league deal with the Seattle Mariners. He batted .243/.316/.362 for Tacoma. He was released on July 4.

Toros de Tijuana
On July 5, 2016, Navarro signed with the Toros de Tijuana of the Mexican Baseball League. He was released on July 7, 2016. On July 9, 2016, Navarro signed a minor league deal with the St. Louis Cardinals.

Detroit Tigers
On January 10, 2017, Navarro signed a minor league contract with the Detroit Tigers that included an invitation to spring training. On September 1, 2017, the Tigers purchased the contract of Navarro and that same day was selected in the starting lineup. He batted .276/.370/.395 with 10 home runs and 61 RBIs in 479 at bats for the triple-A Toledo Mud Hens, and .230/.319/.377 in 61 at bats for the Tigers. He was outrighted to AAA on November 3, 2017. He elected free agency on November 6, 2017.

Chicago Cubs
On January 28, 2018, Navarro signed a minor league deal with the Chicago Cubs. The Cubs promoted him to the major leagues, where he had one hit in six at bats, on April 10 following Anthony Rizzo being placed on the DL. He was outrighted to AAA Iowa Cubs on May 29, 2018, with whom he batted .310/.386/.440 with 4 home runs and 29 RBIs in 184 at bats. He was placed on the temporarily inactive list on June 8 following his decision to play in Japan, and later released on June 14.

Hanshin Tigers

On June 15, 2018, Navarro signed with the Hanshin Tigers of Nippon Professional Baseball (NPB). On December 2, 2019, he became a free agent.
After the 2019 season, he played for Tomateros de Culiacán of the Mexican Pacific League(LVMP).

Toros de Tijuana (second stint)
On February 10, 2020, Navarro signed with the Toros de Tijuana of the Mexican League. In 2020, he did not play a game because of the cancellation of the Mexican League season due to the COVID-19 pandemic.
After the 2020 season, he played for Tomateros of the LVMP. He has also played for Mexico in the 2021 Caribbean Series.

International career
Navarro was selected to the Mexico national baseball team at the 2013 World Baseball Classic, 2017 World Baseball Classic Qualification, 2017 World Baseball Classic, 2019 WBSC Premier12, and 2020 Summer Olympics.

References

External links 
 

1986 births
Living people
Águilas Cibaeñas players
American expatriate baseball players in the Dominican Republic
American baseball players of Mexican descent
American expatriate baseball players in Japan
American expatriate baseball players in Mexico 
Arizona League Angels players
Arkansas Travelers players
Baseball players from Nevada
Cedar Rapids Kernels players
Chicago Cubs players
Detroit Tigers players
Hanshin Tigers players
Iowa Cubs players
Los Angeles Angels players
Major League Baseball first basemen
Memphis Redbirds players
Naranjeros de Hermosillo players
National baseball team players
Nippon Professional Baseball first basemen
Orem Owlz players
Rancho Cucamonga Quakes players
Salt Lake Bees players
Sportspeople from Las Vegas
Tacoma Rainiers players
Toledo Mud Hens players
Toros de Tijuana players
UNLV Rebels baseball players
2013 World Baseball Classic players
2017 World Baseball Classic players
2019 WBSC Premier12 players
Baseball players at the 2020 Summer Olympics
Olympic baseball players of Mexico
Rochester Honkers players